16K resolution is a display resolution with approximately 16,000 pixels horizontally. This resolution has 132.7 megapixels, 16 times as many pixels as 4K resolution and 64 times as many pixels as 1080p resolution.

As of June 2022, 16K resolutions can be run using multi-monitor setups with AMD Eyefinity or Nvidia Surround.

History
In 2016, AMD announced a target for their future graphics cards to support 16K resolution with a refresh rate of 240Hz for "true immersion" in VR.

Linus Tech Tips released a series of videos in 2017 attempting to play video games at 16K using sixteen 4K monitors.

In 2018, US filmmaker Martin Lisius released a short time-lapse film titled, "Prairie Wind" that he produced using a 2-camera Canon EOS 5DS system he developed. This is among the first known 16K videos to exist.

Innolux displayed the world's first 100-inch 16K8K display module at Touch Taiwan in August 2018.

Sony introduced a  commercial 16K display at NAB 2019 that is set to be released in Japan. It is made up of 576 modules (each ) in a formation of 48 by 12 modules, forming a  screen, with  aspect ratio.

On June 26, 2019, VESA formally released the DisplayPort 2.0 standard with support for one 16K (-pixel) display supporting 30-bit-per-pixel 4:4:4 RGB/-color HDR video at a refresh rate of 60Hz using DSC video compression.

See also

 Virtual reality
 10K resolution  digital video formats with a horizontal resolution of around 10,000 pixels, aimed at non-television computer monitor usage
 8K resolution  digital video formats with a horizontal resolution of around 8,000 pixels
 5K resolution  digital video formats with a horizontal resolution of around 5,000 pixels, aimed at non-television computer monitor usage
 4K resolution  digital video formats with a horizontal resolution of around 4,000 pixels
 2K resolution  digital video formats with a horizontal resolution of around 2,000 pixels
 Graphics display resolution

References

Digital imaging
Display technology
Film and video technology
History of television
Television technology
Television terminology
Video signal
Ultra-high-definition television